Félix Martí Garreta (born 21 April 2004) is a Spanish professional footballer who plays as a centre-back for Betis Deportivo Balompié.

Professional career
Garreta is a youth product of Palau-solità i Plegamans, Espanyol, Damm and Real Betis. He began his senior career with Betis Deportivo in 2021, and on 28 September 2022 signed a professional contract with the club until 2026. He made his professional debut with Real Betis in a 0–0 La Liga tie with Athletic Bilbao on 29 December 2022.

Playing style
Garreta first played as a winger as a child, before converting to a centre-back. He is a left-footed centre-back, noted for his ball-handling, agility and maturity.

References

External links
 
 
 

2004 births
Living people
People from Vallès Occidental
Spanish footballers
Association football defenders
Real Betis players
Betis Deportivo Balompié footballers
La Liga players
Primera Federación players
Segunda Federación players